is a Japanese politician of the Democratic Party of Japan, a member of the House of Representatives in the Diet (national legislature). A native of Koga, Ibaraki and graduate of Hosei University, he ran unsuccessfully for the assembly of Ibaraki Prefecture in 1994. He was elected to the House of Representatives for the first time in 2003.

References

External links 
 Official website in Japanese.

Members of the House of Representatives (Japan)
Living people
1961 births
Democratic Party of Japan politicians
Hosei University alumni
21st-century Japanese politicians